Narmda Prasad Rai (born 1910, date of death unknown) was an Indian politician from the Janata Party. He is a Member of the 6th Lok sabha of India. He won the 1977 General election of India from Sagar Lok Sabha constituency.

References

1910 births
Year of death missing
India MPs 1977–1979
Lok Sabha members from Madhya Pradesh
People from Sagar district
Bharatiya Lok Dal politicians
Bharatiya Jana Sangh politicians